The initials S. E. have been used by several people, including:

 S. E. Cottam, English poet and priest
 S. E. Cupp, American political commentator
 S. E. Gontarski, scholar
 S. E. Hinton, American author
 S. E. Krupa Rao, pastor
 S. E. Lister, English novelist
 S. E. Rogers, Manitoba politician
 S. E. Rogie, singer and guitarist
 S. E. Runganadhan, Indian educationist
 S. E. Squires, American politician
 S. E. Winbolt, English archaeologist